The 2003–04 season was the 108th season in existence and their first season in the Football League played by Yeovil Town Football Club, an English football club based in Yeovil, Somerset.

The team reached the third round of the FA Cup before losing 2–0 at home to Premier League side Liverpool. The team played their first ever Football League Cup campaign being knocked out in the first round losing 4–1 away at Luton Town, while in the Football League Trophy the club were knocked out on penalties by Colchester United in the second round. Welsh attacking midfielder Gavin Williams was the club's top goalscorer scoring 13 goals, with 9 in the league, three in the FA Cup and one in the Football League Trophy.

Club

Coaching staff

Kit 

|
|
|

Transfers

In

Out

Loan in

Loan out

Match results 
League positions are sourced from Statto, while the remaining contents of each table are sourced from the references in the "Ref" column.

Third Division

League table

FA Cup

League Cup

Football League Trophy

Squad statistics 
Source:

Numbers in parentheses denote appearances as substitute.
Players with squad numbers struck through and marked  left the club during the playing season.
Players with names in italics and marked * were on loan from another club for the whole of their season with Yeovil.
Players listed with no appearances have been in the matchday squad but only as unused substitutes.

See also 
 2003–04 in English football
 List of Yeovil Town F.C. seasons

Notes

References 

Yeovil Town
Yeovil Town F.C. seasons